Barnowiec  (Barnovets’) is a village in the administrative district of Gmina Łabowa, within Nowy Sącz County, Lesser Poland Voivodeship, in southern Poland.

References

Barnowiec